Diana and Callisto is an oil on canvas painting by Flemish painter Paul Bril. Probably painted in the early 1620s, it was acquired by the National Gallery, London, in 1924.

Subject
In Greek mythology, Callisto was a nymph, or the daughter  of King Lycaon, king of Arcadia (which was claimed by Hesiod). For the Romans, she was one of the virginal companions of Diana, who caught the eye of Zeus (Jupiter). As a follower of Artemis, Callisto took a vow to remain a virgin, as did all the nymphs of Artemis.

According to Hesiod, she was seduced by Zeus, and later, when she was already bearing his child, she was "seen by her bathing and so discovered." After this discovery, "[Artemis] was enraged, and changed her into a beast. Thus she became a bear and gave birth to a son called Arkas." According to the mythographer Apollodorus, Zeus disguised himself as Artemis or Apollo, in order to lure Callisto into his embrace. Likewise, according to the Roman Ovid, Jupiter took the form of Diana so that he might evade his wife Juno's detection, forcing himself upon Callisto while she was separated from Diana and the other nymphs. Callisto's subsequent pregnancy was discovered several months later while she was bathing with Diana and her fellow nymphs. Diana became enraged when she saw that Callisto was pregnant and expelled her from the group. Callisto later gave birth to Arcas. Juno then took the opportunity to avenge her wounded pride and transformed the nymph into a bear. Sixteen years later Callisto, still a bear, encountered her son Arcas hunting in the forest. Just as Arcas was about to kill his own mother with his javelin, Jupiter averted the tragedy by placing mother and son amongst the stars as Ursa Major and Minor, respectively. Juno, enraged that her attempt at revenge had been frustrated, appealed to Tethys that the two might never meet her waters, thus providing a poetic explanation for their circumpolar positions in ancient times.

This story was a favorite subject for some 15th-century, 16th-century and 17th-century patrons and artists. This was possibly related to the opportunity this subject gave to paint nude subjects. In Bril, the small, Italianate, clumsy staffage figures are but a minor ornamentation to the landscape, for whose realization he became celebrated in Rome.

Painting

Bril was born and trained in Antwerp. He subsequently moved to Italy in 1575 or 1582. In Rome, he came into contact with the prominent artists of the time and under the influence of the local art movements. This deeply modified his style, which became "calmer and more classicizing." In the 1620s, Bril produced a number of landscapes, such as Diana and Callisto, wherein "broad tranquil settings are inhabited by mythological figures."

In the painting, Diana is seated on a stone in the foreground. She is already almost completely undressed, and surrounded by the other virgins. Just next to her on the ground, next to two quivers and some red and white clothing, lays her bow.

Diana is gesturing to the group of nymphs on the other side of the body of water. There, some nymphs are forcing Callisto to take off her clothes. On Callisto's right, there is another nymph naked and ready to bathe, while two more nymphs armed with bow and spears and flanked by a dog are watching the scene to the left side of the group.

Dead game, more quivers, a bow and a spear lay next to some blue and red items of clothing on the bottom left. Next to these, there are two dogs looking at the scene. An undulated opening leads from the cove to the open fields. The blue peaks of some high ground are visible in the background.

Big, white clouds are drifting left to right. Tall trees border the painting to the right. Soft light radiates from behind them, illuminating the lefthand portion of the sky against which the trees stand.

The painting was bequeathed to the National Gallery by Sir Claude Phillips upon his death in 1924.

References

External links
The painting at the National Gallery

1620s paintings
Collections of the National Gallery, London
Landscape paintings
Paintings by Paul Bril
Paintings depicting Diana (mythology)
Callisto (mythology)